The 2007 Mississippi Valley State Delta Devils football team represented Mississippi Valley State University during the 2007 NCAA Division I FCS football season.

Schedule

References

Mississippi Valley State
Mississippi Valley State Delta Devils football seasons
Mississippi Valley State Delta Devils football